Aleksandar Miletić (born 30 April 1995) is a Serbian football defender.

References

External links
 
 Aleksandar Miletić stats at utakmica.rs 
 

1996 births
Living people
Sportspeople from Novi Pazar
Association football defenders
Serbian footballers
FK Radnički 1923 players
Serbian First League players
Serbian SuperLiga players